The Moses H. Cone Memorial Park is a country estate in honor of Moses H. Cone in Blowing Rock, North Carolina. It is on the Blue Ridge Parkway between mileposts 292 and 295 with access at milepost 294. Most locals call it Cone Park. The park is run by the National Park Service and is open to the public. The main feature of the park is a twenty-three room  mansion called Flat Top Manor built around the early 1900s. At the manor, there is a craft shop and demonstration center, along with an information desk and book store.

The activities in the park are walking, hiking, cross-country skiing, and horseback riding. More people use the park for hiking and horseback riding than any other activity. There is also fishing available at the two nearby fishing lakes. Many people also do amateur and professional photography, especially in the autumn. The park is open year-round and sees 225,000 people each year being the most visited recreational place on the Blue Ridge Parkway   and second in visitors after the Folk Art Center that sees 250,000 visitors. Together with the Julian Price Memorial Park, it is the largest developed area set aside for public recreation on the Blue Ridge Parkway.

Moses obtained advice from noted conservationist Gifford Pinchot, the pioneering forester at the Biltmore Estate and First Chief of the US Forest Service, on planting white pine forests and hemlock hedges.

It was listed on the National Register of Historic Places in 2013 as Flat Top Estate, a national historic district.  The district encompasses four contributing buildings and two contributing sites.  They include the historic landscape, Flat Top Manor house (1899-1900), carriage house (c. 1899–1905), Cone Cemetery (1908), Sandy Flat Missionary Baptist Church (1908), and the apple barn.

References
 Blue Ridge Parkway brochure (GPO 2006 -320-369/00480) of "North Carolina / Virginia" by the National Park Service (NPS) of the U.S. Department of the Interior.
 Noblitt, Philip T., A Mansion in the Mountains: The Story of Moses and Bertha Cone and their Blowing Rock Manor, Parkway Publishers 1996, 
Buxton, Barry M. Historic Resource Study: Moses H. Cone Estate. National Park Service, 1987.

Footnotes

External links 

Google map location
Parkway Craft Center demonstrations
Blue Ridge Parkway Foundation virtual tour

Houses on the National Register of Historic Places in North Carolina
Historic districts on the National Register of Historic Places in North Carolina
Colonial Revival architecture in North Carolina
Houses completed in 1901
Blue Ridge Parkway
Sculpture gardens, trails and parks in the United States
Appalachian culture in North Carolina
Parks in North Carolina
History museums in North Carolina
Houses in Watauga County, North Carolina
Cone family
Historic house museums in North Carolina
Museums in Watauga County, North Carolina
Protected areas of Watauga County, North Carolina
National Register of Historic Places in Watauga County, North Carolina
1901 establishments in North Carolina